The 2020 North Carolina Tar Heels men's soccer team represented the University of North Carolina at Chapel Hill during the 2020 NCAA Division I men's soccer season. It was the 74th season of the university fielding a program. The Tar Heels were led by tenth year head coach Carlos Somoano and played their home games at Dorrance Field.

The teams' 2020 season was significantly impacted by the COVID-19 pandemic, which curtailed the fall season and caused the NCAA Tournament to be played in Spring 2021. The ACC was one of the only two conferences in men's soccer to play in the fall of 2020.  The ACC also held a mini-season during the spring of 2021.

The Tar Heels finished the fall season 3–2–2 and 3–1–2 in ACC play to finish in second place in the South Division.  In the ACC Tournament lost to Notre Dame in the Quarterfinals.  They finished the spring season 4–2–1 and 4–1–1 in ACC play, to finish in second place in the Coastal Division.  They received an at-large bid to the NCAA Tournament.  As the an unseeded team in the tournament, they progressed pass Charlotte in the Second Round via penalties, defeated Stanford in the Third Round, and Wake Forest in the Quarterfinals before losing to Marshall in the Semifinals to end their season.

Background

The 2019 North Carolina men's soccer team finished the season with a 7–7–4 overall record and a 3–5–0 ACC record.  The Tar Heels were seeded seventh–overall in the 2019 ACC Men's Soccer Tournament.  The Tar Heels were upset in the first round by the tenth seed Syracuse.  The Tar Heels were not invited to the 2019 NCAA Division I Men's Soccer Tournament.  This marked the first year since 2007 that the Tar Heels were not invited to the NCAA Tournament. 

At the end of the season, two Tar Heels men's soccer players wer selected in the 2020 MLS SuperDraft: Jeremy Kelly and Jack Skahan.

Player movement

Departures

Recruiting class

Squad

Roster 

Updated December 10, 2020

Team management 

Source:

Schedule

Source:

|-
!colspan=6 style=""| Fall Exhibition

|-
!colspan=6 style=""| Fall Regular season

|-
!colspan=6 style=""| ACC Tournament

|-
!colspan=6 style=""| Spring Exhibition

|-
!colspan=6 style=""| Spring Regular Season

|-
!colspan=6 style=""| NCAA Tournament

Awards and honors

2021 MLS Super Draft

Source:

Rankings

Fall 2020

Spring 2021

References 

2020
North Carolina Tar Heels
North Carolina Tar Heels
North Carolina Tar Heels men's soccer
North Carolina
NCAA Division I Men's Soccer Tournament College Cup seasons